Sai River is a river in western India in Gujarat whose origin is near Reha village of Kutch. The other villages through which the river flows are Wandh, Kapadisar, Kadoli and Kotadi.

References

Rivers of Gujarat
Geography of Kutch district
Rivers of India